The Seven Sisters refers to a historical collection of seven law firms with offices across Canada, majority of which have head offices in Toronto, Ontario.

History
The term "Seven Sisters" was originally coined by John Alexander Black, founder of Lexpert Magazine (previously owned by Thomson Reuters and now owned by Key Media). At the time, the Seven Sisters dominated the Canadian M&A legal advisory rankings. However, by 2006, Black stated "the moniker may have run its course and that some people argue the Seven have shrunk to two or possibly three." Later that year, The Globe and Mail reported the Seven Sisters term was no longer valid, explaining that "as the Canadian pool of major companies boils down to a thin concentrate, the upper legal tier has also shrunk." It noted that "most observers agree the reigning top players are McCarthy Tetrault LLP, Stikeman Elliott LLP, Osler Hoskin & Harcourt LLP and Blake Cassels & Graydon LLP." In 2014, National Post reported "the Chambers Global rankings for Canadian law firms confirm that it's time to retire the notion that "Seven Sisters" dominate Canadian law firms." As of 2022, only five of the original seven have become national law firms in Canada – the aforementioned four plus Torys LLP.

In 2015, The Globe and Mail reported that the market had changed markedly from the early 2000s: "Elite U.S. legal shops blanket the top 25 firms for M&A, taking 13 of the top spots on the chart." According to Bloomberg (FY 2021), the top 10 legal advisors by volume for M&A transactions with any Canadian involvement were Osler (TO), Davies (TO), Sullivan & Cromwell (NY), Wachtell Lipton (NY), Blakes (TO), Latham & Watkins (LA), White & Case (NY), Kirkland & Ellis (CHI), Torys (TO), and Freshfields (LON), signalling the integration of Canada into the larger North American and international market. The same Bloomberg (FY 2021) report shows the top 10 M&A legal advisors by deal count in Canada consisting of Fasken, Gowling WLG, Blakes, Osler, Stikeman, McCarthy, Davies, Cassels, Kirkland & Ellis, and Miller Thomson. 

The 'club of nine' was a similar term used in the UK until it was replaced by the Magic Circle.

Membership
In alphabetical order, the historical Seven Sisters included: Blakes, Davies, Goodmans, McCarthy, Osler, Stikeman, and Torys.

The American Lawyer Global 200 
The American Lawyer 2022 Global 200, first published in 2018, included a total of eight Canadian law firms, excluding Gowling WLG which operates as two separate partnerships across the Atlantic.

Canada's Largest Law Firms 
Lexpert Magazine publishes a yearly list of The 30 Largest Law Firms in Canada ranked by total number of lawyers.

See also
Magic Circle (law)
Silver Circle (law)
White shoe firm
Big Six law firms
Red Circle (law)
Big Four law firms (Japan)

References

Law firms of Canada
Neologisms